Po Leung Kuk No.1 W. H. Cheung College (also known as Po 1 ) is a secondary school located at 173 Po Kong Village Road, Tsz Wan Shan, Wong Tai Sin, Hong Kong. It was the first school established by Po Leung Kuk in 1971, and was named Po Leung Kuk C.F.A. No. 1 College then. It was also the first where students strive for school voucher scheme. The current principal is Mr. Chow Chor Shing.

History
In the 1970s, the Hong Kong Government encouraged secondary learning. Therefore, Po Leung Kuk started a plan to establish the first secondary school.
In 1967, Hong Kong Government allotted 50,000 sq. meter of land to Po Leung Kuk to help with her work. She made use of the land to establish her first secondary school, named as Po Leung Kuk (PLK) Committee Fellowship Association (CFA) No.1 Secondary School. The establishment of the school drove Po Leung Kuk to establish more schools to provide education services. Later, the school was provided with classrooms from PLK CFA No.4 Primary School (Now Po Leung Kuk Ho Sau Nan Primary School). In September, the school started 12 classes of Forms 1-3.
In 1971, PLK CFA No.1 Secondary School was formally established. After a year, the construction of the school building was finished.
On 21 February 1973, Hong Kong's 25th Governor Sir Murray MacLehose arrived to the school site to attend the opening ceremony of the school.
In 1988, all classrooms and special rooms are facilitated with air conditioners.
In 1994, the school receive a fund from Cheung Wing Hing Foundation. The fund was used to further improve the environment of the school.
To commemorate Mr Cheung Wing Hing's contribution to the school, it was then renamed as 'Po Leung Kuk No.1 W. H. Cheung College'.
 In 2010, the school rejected class reduction and proposed that one more new wing is to be built in the campus. In 2011, the construction was finished and the building was named "Ngan Po Ling Annex" to commemorate Ms Ngan Po Ling's generous financial help for the construction to be possible.

School Associations

Student Association
Student Association (S.A.) holds a few activities each year.

Prefect Team
Prefect Team is responsible for carrying out the school's rules.

The Four Houses
Students are sorted into four houses by the time they first registered a place in school. The four houses are Red House, Yellow House, Green House and Blue House.

Others
Po Leung Kuk's colleges share similar uniforms. As there is the Po Leung Kuk Celine Ho Yam Tong School near Po Leung Kuk No.1 W. H. Cheung College, it is sometimes difficult to distinguish between. Therefore, Po Leung Kuk No.1 W. H. Cheung College designed a special house badge for all of the students, which they must wear at school. The badge consists of the words "PLK No.1 College" in red and is contoured by the colour of the bearer's house.

Alumni
Politics
Edward Yau (Yau Tang-wah) - Director of Chief Executive Office
Gracie Foo - Former Deputy Director of Broadcasting

Entertainment Industry
Yumiko Cheng - singer
Kellyjackie - singer

See also
Po Leung Kuk Ho Sau Nan Primary School
Po Leung Kuk Celine Ho Yam Tong School

References

External links
Po Leung Kuk No.1 W. H. Cheung College

Educational institutions established in 1971
Secondary schools in Hong Kong
Po Leung Kuk